Resolven is a small village and community in Neath Port Talbot county borough, Wales.  It is located in the Vale of Neath.

Location 
Together with the community of Clyne and Melincourt, the village makes up the Resolven electoral ward.
The community includes the settlements of Rheola, Abergarwed, and Ynysarwed.

History and amenities 
In the immediate surrounding areas there are a number of industrial sites, which have become somewhat run down during the 1980s and 1990s. The popular Rheola indoor market was located near the village on the site of an old industrial factory, but has since moved from Rheola and now resides in the old TRW Steering Systems building. The vacated site has plans to restore Rheola House and its estate buildings, and establish leisure and tourism facilities.

The larger surrounding area has much attractive countryside and a substantial wind farm above the village at Ffynnon Oer.

Resolven has played host to one of the best known stages of the Wales Rally GB for many years.

Resolven is host to Welsh Rugby Union affiliated team Resolven RFC.

Resolven is also host to Football Association Wales affiliated team Resolven AFC.

The Neath and Tennant Canal has been restored and now has over four miles of walkable towpath between Resolven and Glynneath. The Vale of Neath Railway is still used for freight transport between Neath and Cwmgwrach.

Notable residents
Debbie Llewellyn, originally from Resolven, was the Mayor of Gloucester for 2014–15
Mel James, Welsh Rugby Union professional player 
Daniel Jervis, swimmer
Sir Clifford Darby (1909–1992), geographer, was born in Resolven
Peter Hain, Anti-Apartheid campaigner, former cabinet minister, and member of the Privy Council

References

External links 
  Cymdeithas Hanes Resolfen History Society
  Monumental Inscriptions for Resolven
  Resolven Rugby Club Official Site
 www.geograph.co.uk : photos of Resolven and surrounding area

Villages in Neath Port Talbot
Vale of Neath
Rally GB